Sedef Avcı Kasabalı (born 22 January 1982) is a Turkish model and actress. Her maternal family emigrated from Sarajevo, Bosnia and Herzegovina. Her paternal family is from Erzincan. She won Elite Model Look Turkey in 1997. She represented Turkey at Miss Universe contestant in 2001.

She starred with Kıvanç Tatlıtuğ in the Turkish television series Menekşe ile Halil. She is also known for playing Bahar in the Turkish television series Ezel.

With Engin Altan Düzyatan, she played in Romantik Komedi, Romantik Komedi 2: Bekarlığa Veda, Çöp Adam.

Filmography

References

External links
 
 Sedef Avci at TurkishStarsDaily

1982 births
Living people
Miss Universe 2001 contestants
Turkish film actresses
Turkish beauty pageant winners
Turkish female models
Turkish people of Bosniak descent
Turkish television actresses